The Serfs (German: Die Leibeigenen) is a 1928 German silent drama film directed by Richard Eichberg and starring Heinrich George, Mona Maris and Maria Reisenhofer. It was shot at the Babelsberg Studios in Berlin. The film's art direction was by Jacek Rotmil. It premiered on 11 January 1928 at the Gloria-Palast.

Cast
 Heinrich George as Wildhüter Nikita 
 Mona Maris as Leibeigene Tatjana, eine Waise 
 Maria Reisenhofer as Gräfin Danischeff 
 Harry Halm as Alexej Danischeff, ihr Sohn 
 Oskar Homolka as Gouverneur Fürst Kurganow 
 Jutta Jol as Sonja Kurganow, seine Tochter

References

Bibliography
 Grange, William. Cultural Chronicle of the Weimar Republic. Scarecrow Press, 2008.

External links

1928 films
1928 drama films
Films of the Weimar Republic
German silent feature films
German drama films
Films directed by Richard Eichberg
German black-and-white films
Films set in the Russian Empire
UFA GmbH films
Silent drama films
Films shot at Babelsberg Studios
1920s German films
1920s German-language films